Grab It for a Second is an album by Dutch rock band Golden Earring, released in 1978.

Track listing
All songs written by Hay and Kooymans.

"Roxanne" - 3:39
"Leather" - 5:01
"Tempting" - 3:43
"U-Turn Time" - 3:25
"Movin' Down Life" - 3:31
"Against the Grain" - 4:35
"Grab It for a Second" - 4:10
"Cell-29" - 6:39

Personnel
Barry Hay - vocals
George Kooymans - guitar,  Arp synthesizer guitar, vocals
Eelco Gelling - guitar, slide guitar
Rinus Gerritsen - bass guitar, Moog Bison synth bass
Cesar Zuiderwijk - drums

Additional personnel
Lani Groves - backing vocals
Jimmy Maelen - percussion
Kevin Nance - keyboards
John Zangrando - saxophone on "Against the Grain"

Production
Producer: Jimmy Iovine
Engineer: Shelly Yakus
Assistant engineers: John Kriek, Thom Panunzio
Mastering: Greg Calbi
String arrangements: Kenny Ascher
Design: Barry Hay, Mick Rock, Ernst Thormahlen
Photography: Anton Corbijn, Mick Rock
Illustrations: Ernst Thormahlen

Charts

References

Golden Earring albums
1978 albums
Albums produced by Jimmy Iovine
Polydor Records albums